James Arthur Shires (born November 15, 1945) is a Canadian retired professional ice hockey winger who played 56 games in the National Hockey League with the St. Louis Blues, Detroit Red Wings, and Pittsburgh Penguins between 1970 and 1973. The rest of his career, which lasted from 1968 to 1975, was spent in the minor leagues. He played college hockey for the University of Denver.

Career statistics

Regular season and playoffs

External links
 

1945 births
Living people
Amarillo Wranglers players
Canadian ice hockey left wingers
Denver Pioneers men's ice hockey players
Denver Spurs (WHL) players
Detroit Red Wings players
Edmonton Oil Kings (WCHL) players
Fort Wayne Komets players
Fort Worth Wings players
NCAA men's ice hockey national champions
Omaha Knights (CHL) players
Pittsburgh Penguins players
San Diego Gulls (WHL) players
St. Louis Blues players
Ice hockey people from Edmonton